Everbridge, Inc. is an American enterprise software company that offers applications which provide information about critical events to help with personal safety and business continuity. Formerly known as 3n Global and the National Notification Network, Everbridge began operations in 2002. In an emergency, Everbridge sends messages via telephone, text message and email, but stop once they know that a person has read a message. An app allows emergency managers to track geotagged tweets that contain specific hashtags and use this information to respond to incidents as they occur.

Their system was used in 2012 to send over 10 million messages to residents during Hurricane Sandy. During the Boston Marathon bombings in April 2013, the city of Boston used Everbridge for its critical communications. Everbridge relayed information to business operators, employees, firefighters, hospital staff, police and residents after the explosions and during the lockdown of Boston, Watertown, Waltham and surrounding areas. It was also used during the COVID-19 pandemic to provide updates to Boston residents.

In 2016, Everbridge raised $90 million in an IPO, becoming a publicly traded company (EVBG) on the Nasdaq stock exchange. In 2017, its revenues totaled $104 million. Three years later, that figure rose to $271 million.

The company's customers include the University of Mississippi, the U.S. Army, West Virginia, Hartsfield-Jackson Atlanta International Airport, and the countries of Norway, Peru, and Australia.

History
Formerly known as 3n Global, a wholly owned subsidiary of the National Notification Network, the company was founded in 2002 in response to the September 11 attacks to assist with crisis coordination. It changed its name to Everbridge in April 2009.

In addition, Everbridge has been used to alert residents and first responders during Hurricanes Sandy and Dorian.

The company saw an increase in users during the COVID-19 pandemic.

Everbridge products rely on sources such as threat data, social media, traffic cameras, and 9-1-1 data.

Acquisitions 
The following is a list of acquisitions by Everbridge:
 Nixle (2015)
 IDV Solutions (2017)
 Svensk Krisledning AB (2017)
 Unified Messaging Systems (2018)
 NC4 (2019)
 one2many (2020)
 Techwan SA (2020)
 SnapComms (2020)
 xMatters (2021)
 RedSky Technologies (2021)
 Anvil (2022)

Leadership 
Everbridge is led by David Wagner as new CEO, successor to David Meredith, Other notable executives include chief customer experience officer John Maeda,  chief communications Jessica Deckinger, chief security officer Tracy Reinhold, and chief technology officer Imad Mouline.

See also 
 Emergency management

References

External links

Public safety networks
Public safety communications
Emergency communication
Health care companies established in 2002
Companies listed on the Nasdaq